John Callan O'Laughlin (January 11, 1873 – March 14, 1949) was a journalist and longtime publisher of the Army and Navy Journal.

Biography
John Callan O'Laughlin was born in Washington, D.C. on January 11, 1873.

He served as United States Assistant Secretary of State from January 28, 1909 to March 5, 1909.

He died at Walter Reed General Hospital on March 14, 1949.

References

1873 births
1949 deaths
American male journalists
United States Assistant Secretaries of State
Burials at Arlington National Cemetery
Illinois Republicans
Illinois Progressives (1912)